The XXI Corps was an Army Corps of the British Army during World War I. The Corps was formed in Palestine in August 1917 under the command of Lieutenant General Edward Bulfin. It formed part of the Egyptian Expeditionary Force (EEF) and served in the Sinai and Palestine Campaign. At the Battle of Sharon it fought what has been described as 'one of the most overwhelmingly successful operations of the war' and 'a precursor to the modern Blitzkrieg.' It then carried out remarkable march up the coast of modern-day Lebanon as the war came to an end.

Origin
When General Sir Edmund Allenby took over command of the Egyptian Expeditionary Force (EEF) in Palestine in the Summer of 1917, he completely reorganised it. XXI Corps Headquarters was formed on 12 August at Deir al-Balah to take responsibility for the left section of the EEF's line in front of Gaza City, including 52nd (Lowland), 54th (East Anglian) and 75th Divisions and three brigades of heavy artillery. It could also call on 10th (Irish) Division in GHQ Reserve. A signal company and XXI Corps Cavalry Regiment were formed for the corps, the latter by taking over three divisional cavalry squadrons. Major-General Edward Bulfin of 60th (2/2nd London) Division was promoted to Lieutenant-General to command the new formation, which was built up during the late summer for the resumption of the offensive in October.

Service

Order of Battle, October 1917
The composition of the corps at the beginning of the Third Battle of Gaza was as follows:
 Corps Headquarters
 General Officer Commanding, Lt-Gen Edward Bulfin
 Brigadier-General, General Staff, Brig-Gen E.T. Humphreys
 Deputy Adjutant and Quartermaster-General, Brig-Gen St. G.B. Armstrong
 52nd (Lowland) Division, Maj-Gen John Hill
 155th (South Scottish) Brigade
 156th (Scottish Rifles) Brigade
 157th (Highland Light Infantry) Brigade
 54th (East Anglian) Division, Maj-Gen Steuart Hare
 161st (Essex) Brigade
 162nd (East Midland) Brigade
 163rd (Norfolk and Suffolk) Brigade
 75th Division, Maj-Gen Philip Palin
 232nd Brigade
 233rd Brigade
 234th Brigade
 XXI Corps Cavalry Regiment
 A Squadron 1/1st Duke of Lancaster's Own Yeomanry
 A Squadron 1/1st Hertfordshire Yeomanry
 C Squadron 1/1st Queen's Own Royal Glasgow Yeomanry
 Commander, Corps Royal Artillery, Brig-Gen Hugh Simpson-Baikie
 XCVII Heavy Artillery Group, Royal Garrison Artillery (RGA)
 189th and 195th Heavy Batteries
 201st, 205th, 300th and 380th Siege Batteries
 C Heavy Artillery Group, RGA
 10th Heavy Battery
 43rd, 134th, 379th, 422nd and 423rd Siege Batteries
 CII Heavy Artillery Group, RGA
 202nd Heavy Battery
 209th, 292nd, 420th, 421st and 424th Siege Batteries
 XCV Heavy Artillery Group, RGA (HQ arrived by March 1918)
 Royal Engineers (RE), Chief Engineer, Brig-Gen R.P.T. Hawksley
 XXI Corps Signal Company, RE 
 21 Corps Wireless Section, RE
 Machine Gun Corps (MGC) 
 E Company, MGC (Heavy Branch), became Detachment Tank Corps, EEF
 211th Machine Gun Company

Invasion of Palestine

The EEF's offensive began with the Third Battle of Gaza. While the Desert Mounted Corps (DMC) and XX Corps prepared to break through the Turkish line at the Battle of Beersheba on 31 October, XXI Corps began a bombardment of the Gaza defences on 27 October, and carried out holding attacks on 1–3 November. By the night of 6/7 November the pressure from the direction of Beersheba was so great that the Turks began to evacuate Gaza. XXI Corps was ordered to pursue vigorously and capture Wadi el Hesi before  the Turks could occupy the strong position there. 52nd (L) Division was brought up from corps reserve to carry this out with 157th Brigade in conjunction with the Imperial Service Cavalry Brigade (composed of Imperial Service Troops from the Princely states of India), which GHQ released for the task. XXI Corps Cavalry led the two brigades and quickly took Beit Lahi, but the IS Cavalry Bde had a lengthy approach march, came under fire as soon as it emerged from Gaza, and was unable to take Beit Hanoun that day. Meanwhile 157th Bde, hugging the cliffs, had advanced along the beach across the mouth of the wadi. Next day 52nd (L) Division attacked inland against Sausage Ridge, while XXI Corps Cavalry swept round Beit Hanoun, overrunning some retreating Turkish heavy artillery and making contact with the Australian Mounted Division of the DMC.

The advance then continued and XXI Corps was involved in the following actions:
 Battle of Mughar Ridge:
 Action at Burqa 12 November
 Mughar Ridge 13 November
 Occupation of Junction Station 14 November
 Battle of Nebi Samwil 17–24 November
 Defence of Jerusalem 27–28 November
 Battle of Jaffa 11–22 December:
 Passage of the Nahr el Auja 21 December
 Battle of Tell 'Asur 8–12 March 1918:
 Fight at Ras el 'Ain 12 March
 Action of Berukin 9–10 April

Order of Battle, September 1918
Following the German Spring Offensive on the Western Front in March 1918, the EEF was obliged to send reinforcements to the British Expeditionary Force. Many of its units and formations were replaced by others from the Indian Army (of the infantry divisions only 54th (East Anglian) was not 'Indianised'). The EEF was then reorganised during the summer of 1918 in preparation for the final offensive. The composition of XXI Corps at the beginning of the Battle of Megiddo was as follows:
 Corps HQ
 GOC, Lt-Gen Sir Edward Bulfin
BGGS, Brig-Gen H.F. Salt
 DAQMG, Brig-Gen St. G.B. Armstrong
 3rd (Lahore) Division, Maj-Gen Reginald Hoskins
 7th Indian Brigade
 8th Indian Brigade
 9th Indian Brigade
 7th (Meerut) Division Maj-Gen Sir Vere Fane
 19th Indian Brigade
 21st Indian Brigade
 28th Indian Brigade (Frontier Force)
 54th (East Anglian) Division, Maj-Gen Steuart Hare
 161st (Essex) Brigade
 162nd (East Midland) Brigade
 163rd (Norfolk and Suffolk) Brigade
 Détachement Français de Palestine et de Syrie, Colonel Giles de Piépape
 Régiment de Marche de Tirailleurs
 Régiment de Marche de la Légion d'Orient
 60th Division, Maj-Gen John Shea
 179th Brigade
 180th Brigade
 181st Brigade
 75th Division, Maj-Gen Philip Palin
 232nd Brigade
 233rd Brigade
 233rd Brigade
 5th Australian Light Horse Brigade
 XXI Corps Cavalry Regiment
 A Sqn 1/1st Duke of Lancaster's Own Yeomanry
 A and B Sqns 1/1st Hertfordshire Yeomanry
 Commander, Corps RA, Brig-Gen Hugh Simpson-Baikie
 XCV Brigade, RGA
 181st Heavy Bty
 304th, 314th, 383rd and 422nd Siege Btys
 XCVI Brigade, RGA
 189th and 202nd Heavy Btys
 378th and 394th Siege Btys  
 C Brigade, RGA
 15th Heavy Bty
 134th and 334th Siege Btys, sections 43rd and 300th Siege Btys
 CII Brigade, RGA
 91st Heavy Bty
 209th, 380th and 440th Siege Btys, sections 43rd and 300th Siege Btys
 VIII Mountain Brigade, RGA
 11th, 13th and 17th Mountain Btys
 IX Mountain Brigade, RGA
 10th, 12th and 16th Mountain Btys
 Royal Engineers, Chief Engineer, Brig-Gen R.P.T. Hawksley
 13th Pontoon Park, RE (also known as 13th Base Park Company, RE)
 14th Army Troops Company, RE
 XXI Corps Signal Company, RE
 21 Corps Wireless Section, RE

Final Offensive

The Battle of Megiddo was launched on 19 September. XXI Corps, with five infantry divisions and a cavalry brigade, had the task of breaking through Turkish trench lines that in places were deep. However, it had overwhelming superiority in artillery and was aided by deception plans. The corps had established a bridging school on the Nahr el Auja two months earlier and the Turks had become accustomed to pontoon bridges being laid and then dismantled: on the night of 18/19 September they were left in place for the assault troops to use next morning. During the Battle of Sharon (or Battle of Tulkarm) XXI Corps broke through and overwhelmed the right of the strong Turkish defence system from Biddya to the sea. XXI Corps next began a pursuit over the Plain of Sharon and captured Nablus on 21 September. Action on XXI Corps' front then ceased while the rest of the EEF kept up the pressure on the Turks. The Official History described the part played by XXI Corps in the battle as 'one of the most overwhelmingly successful operations of the war', and praised the staff for their efforts to supply water as the advance progressed.

After the Battle of Sharon XXI Corps' divisions were employed on salvage work and road repair. 54th (EA) Division concentrated at Haifa, 60th and 75th Divisions left the corps and came directly under GHQ, while 3rd (Indian) Division did garrison duty under the DMC. By late September the EEF was closing in on Damascus and ordered XXI Corps to secure the coast and ports of Syria. 7th (Indian) Division, which had already shown remarkable powers of marching, was ordered to march to Beirut along the coast road. Starting on 29 September, the division advanced in three columns, Column A consisted of XXI Corps Cavalry Regiment, a light armoured motor battery (armoured cars), and a single infantry company; the Indian Sapper companies and Pioneer battalion followed with Column B. On 2 October the division was confronted by the Ladder of Tyre, a narrow ancient track consisting of steps cut into the cliff. There was no alternative route. Extensive engineering work would be required to make it passable for wheeled vehicles, with the danger of the whole cliff shelf falling into the sea. After a few minutes' consideration, Bulfin ordered the engineers to begin work. The task of preparing the half-mile (800 m) track took two-and-a-half days, but was successfully completed so that the 60-pounder guns of 15th Heavy Bty, RGA, could get through. Before it was completed, XXI Corps Cavalry Regiment advanced cross-country on 4 October and entered Tyre, where the Royal Navy landed supplies for the columns. On 6 October the advanced troops secured Sidon, where further supplies were landed, and on 8 October they entered Beirut, where Corps HQ was established in the Deutscherhof''' Hotel.Falls, pp. 509–11, 602–4.

On 11 October Column A was suddenly ordered to occupy Tripoli,  further on, by the evening of 13 October, which it achieved, arriving in moonlight. The leading infantry brigade of 7th (Indian) Division arrived on 18 October, having covered  in 40 days. The leading troops of 54th (EA) Division began arriving on 31 October, the day on which hostilities in the theatre were ended Armistice of Mudros.Falls, pp. 605–7.

General Officers Commanding
The following officers commanded the corps during its service:
 Lieutenant-General Edward Bulfin 18 August 1917 – 13 June 1918
 Major-General Sir Vere Fane 13 June – 14 August 1918 (acting)
 Major-General Reginald Hoskins 14 August – 19 August 1918 (acting)
 Lieutenant-General Sir Edward Bulfin 19 August – November 1918

 See also 
 Military history of the United Kingdom
 List of British corps in World War I
 Egyptian Expeditionary Force

 Notes 

 References 

 Maj A.F. Becke,History of the Great War: Order of Battle of Divisions, Part 4: The Army Council, GHQs, Armies, and Corps 1914–1918, London: HM Stationery Office, 1944/Uckfield: Naval & Military Press, 2007, .
 
 David L. Bullock, Allenby's War: The Palestine-Arabian Campaigns 1916–1918, London: Blandford Press, 1988, .
 Capt Cyril Falls, History of the Great War: Military Operations, Egypt and Palestine, Vol II, From June 1917 to the End of the War, Part I, London: HM Stationery Office, 1930/Uckfield: Naval & Military Press, 2013, .
 Capt Cyril Falls, History of the Great War: Military Operations, Egypt and Palestine, Vol II, From June 1917 to the End of the War, Part II, London: HM Stationery Office, 1930/Uckfield: Naval & Military Press, 2013, .
 
 Cliff Lord & Graham Watson, Royal Corps of Signals: Unit Histories of the Corps (1920–2001) and its Antecedents, Solihull: Helion, 2003, .
William T. Massey, Allenby’s Final Triumph (London: Constable & Co., London 1920)
 Bryan Perrett, Megiddo 1918: The Last Great Cavalry Victory, London: Osprey, 1999, .
 Lt-Col J.D. Sainsbury, The Hertfordshire Yeomanry: An Illustrated History' 1794–1920', Welwyn: Hertfordshire Yeomanry and Artillery Historical Trust/Hart Books, 1994, .
 Graham E. Watson & Richard A. Rinaldi, The Corps of Royal Engineers: Organization and Units 1889–2018, Tiger Lily Books, 2018, .
 
Woodward, David Hell in the Holy Land: World War I in the Middle East Publisher University Press of Kentucky, (2006),

External sources
 

British field corps
Corps of the British Army in World War I
Military units and formations established in 1917
Military units and formations disestablished in 1919